Denis Rusu (born 2 August 1990) is a Moldovan professional footballer who plays as a goalkeeper.

Club career

After progressing through the various youth teams of CSCT Buiucani, in 2008, Rusu moved to first league team Rapid Chișinău. He made his debut for Rapid in the 2009–10 season.

Politehnica Iași
After three years and winning the 2013–14 Moldovan Cup with Zimbru Chișinău, Rusu moved to Romanian first division club Politehnica Iași, and signed a short six-month contract with the team. He made his debut for his new side, on 12 February 2018, in a 1-0 win over local rivals FC Botoșani as a replacement for the injured Alexei Koșelev. After some good performances and helping Politehnica to the Championship play-offs, Rusu signed a new two-year deal to keep him in place until the summer of 2020.

Honours
Zimbru Chișinău
Moldovan Cup: 2013–14
Moldovan Super Cup: 2014

Universitatea Craiova
Supercupa României: 2021

References

External links

Denis Rusu at Zimbru.md
Denis Rusu at Sports.md

1990 births
Living people
Moldovan people of Romanian descent
Footballers from Chișinău
Moldovan footballers
Moldova under-21 international footballers
Association football goalkeepers
Moldovan Super Liga players
Liga I players
Liga II players
FC Rapid Ghidighici players
FC Zimbru Chișinău players
FC Politehnica Iași (2010) players
ACS Viitorul Târgu Jiu players
CS Universitatea Craiova players
Moldovan expatriate footballers
Moldovan expatriate sportspeople in Romania
Expatriate footballers in Romania
Moldova international footballers